Antonio Ricci (died 24 December 1483) was a Roman Catholic prelate who served as Bishop of Lecce (1453–1483).

Biography
On 20 July 1453, Antonio Ricci was appointed by Pope Nicholas V as Bishop of Lecce. He served as Bishop of Lecce until his death on 24 December 1483.

References

External links and additional sources
 (for Chronology of Bishops) 
 (for Chronology of Bishops) 

15th-century Italian Roman Catholic bishops
1483 deaths
Bishops appointed by Pope Nicholas V